The 1995–96 All-Ireland Senior Club Football Championship was the 26th staging of the All-Ireland Senior Club Football Championship since its establishment by the Gaelic Athletic Association in 1970-71.

Kilmacud Crokes were the defending champions, however, they failed to qualify after being beaten in the Dublin County Championship.

On 17 March 1996, Laune Rangers won the championship following a 4-05 to 0-11 defeat of Éire Óg in the All-Ireland final at Croke Park. It was their first ever championship title.

Results

Munster Senior Club Football Championship

First round

Semi-finals

Final

All-Ireland Senior Club Football Championship

Quarter-final

Semi-finals

Final

Championship statistics

Miscellaneous

 Mullaghbawn won the Ulster Club Championship for the first time in their history.
 Laune Ranges won the Munster Club Championship for the first time in their history.

References

1995 in Gaelic football
1996 in Gaelic football